Celestial Completion is the fourth studio album by the American heavy metal band Becoming the Archetype, released on March 29, 2011 through Solid State Records.

Becoming the Archetype added some diversity and unusual elements to their sound on Celestial Completion. The album features instruments and techniques that are not common for a metal band, including: trombones, sitars, tamburas, tablas, vocoders, an intro with "operatic soprano vocals and four-part harmony," and a recording of a Mass.

In April 2010, when the group was only in the early stages of writing a new album, Celestial Completion was given the working title of In a Monstrous World of Half-Human Deities, Some People Will Unfortunately Die from Old Age.

Ryan Clark, art director for Solid State Records and vocalist for Demon Hunter, contacted Dan Seagrave to design the artwork for Celestial Completion. Seagrave had previously designed the art for Becoming the Archetype's debut album Terminate Damnation.

In its debut week, Celestial Completion sold approximately 2,100 copies and ranked at number 7 on Billboard'''s Top Heatseekers chart.

The title of track four, "The Path of the Beam", is a reference to Stephen King's The Dark Tower, which bassist/vocalist, Jason Wisdom, & guitarist/keyboardist/clean vocalist, Seth Hecox are both fans of.

This would be vocalist/bassist Jason Wisdom's and drummer Brent Duckett's last album with Becoming the Archetype until 2022, as they both parted ways with the band in November 2011.

Track listing

PersonnelCelestial Completion'' credits as adapted from Allmusic.

Becoming the Archetype
 Jason Wisdom - vocals/bass
 Count Seth Hecox - guitars/keys/vocals
 Daniel Gailey - guitars/vocals
 Brent "Duck" Duckett - drums

Additional musicians
 Ivey Norton – vocals on tracks 1 & 7
 Nathan O'Brien – trombone on track 1
 Dennis Culp (Five Iron Frenzy)– trombone on track 9
 Kim Stice – violin on track 11
 Sean Patrick Murphy – sitar, tambura & tablas on tracks 6 & 8

Production and recording
 Troy Glessner – mastering
 Matt Goldman – engineer, mixing, producer
 Matt McClellan – engineer

Artwork and packaging
 Becoming the Archetype – art direction
 Ryan Clark – design
 Dan Seagrave – painting
 Troy Stains – band photo

References

2011 albums
Becoming the Archetype albums
Solid State Records albums
Albums produced by Matt Goldman
Albums with cover art by Dan Seagrave